Carboxylesterase, type B is a family of evolutionarily related proteins.

Higher eukaryotes have many distinct esterases. The different types include those that act on carboxylic esters. Carboxyl-esterases have been classified into three categories (A, B and C) on the basis of differential patterns of inhibition by organophosphates. The sequence of a number of type-B carboxylesterases indicates that the majority are evolutionarily related. As is the case for lipases and serine proteases, the catalytic apparatus of esterases involves three residues (catalytic triad): a serine, a glutamate or aspartate and a histidine. This family belongs to the superfamily of proteins with the Alpha/beta hydrolase fold.

Subfamilies
Neuroligin 
Cholinesterase

Examples 

Human genes that encode proteins containing the carboxylesterase domain include:

 ACHE
 ARACHE
 BCHE
 CEL
 CES1
 CES2
 CES3
 CES4
 CES7
 CES8
 NLGN1
 NLGN2
 NLGN3
 NLGN4X
 NLGN4Y
 TG

See also 
 Carboxylesterase

References

External links
 Carboxylesterases type-B in PROSITE

Protein families
Peripheral membrane proteins